Joshua Smith (born 1976) is an American artist based in New York City.

Biography
Smith was born in Okinawa, Japan and raised in Tennessee. Trained as a printmaker, he initially began working with collages in the early 2000s. He combined photocopies, documents and drawing in layers to create abstract images reacting to surreal and expressionist ways of painting.

He first became known in the early 2000s, however, for a body of work that consisted of paintings featuring letters from his own name:  Smith used the letters as a base for building abstract imagery. In recent years, he has made numerous partly-figurative series, including series featuring palm trees, skeletons, fishes and devils, among other varied themes. He also makes artist books and collages. Amongst Smith's favourite and more famous motifs is the Grim Reaper, which first appeared in 11 works for his 2017 solo exhibition at STANDARD (OSLO).

He also makes artist books, sculptures, ceramics, and collages.

Smith attended Miami University from 1994 to 1996 and the University of Tennessee from 1996 to 1998.

Exhibitions

Solo exhibitions 

Josh Smith Spectre at David Zwirner, London 2020
Josh Smith at Bonner Kunstverein, Bonn 2016
The American Dream at The Brant Foundation Art, Greenwich, Connecticut 2011
Josh Smith at Deitch Studios, New York 2010
Josh Smith at Luhring Augustine, New York City 2009
Josh Smith at Jonathan Viner Gallery, London, 2007

Group exhibitions 
The Forever Now: Contemporary Painting in an Atemporal World, MOMA, New York, 2015
Josh Smith in Surface to Surface, Jonathan Viner Gallery, London 2012
Barbaric Freedom at Simon Lee, London 2010

References

External links

Documentation of recent Josh Smith exhibitions
Further information from Luhring Augustine
Josh Smith on the Saatchi Gallery
Josh Smith on Ocula.com
Josh Smith on www.artnet.com
Josh Smith on www.jonathanvinergallery.com

American artists
Miami University alumni
University of Tennessee alumni
Living people
1976 births